Eric Brochon (13 July 1905 – 11 March 1991) was a Swiss water polo player. He competed in the men's tournament at the 1928 Summer Olympics.

References

External links

1905 births
1991 deaths
Swiss male water polo players
Olympic water polo players of Switzerland
Water polo players at the 1928 Summer Olympics